Cetoconcha elegans is a species of saltwater clams in the genus Cetoconcha. It is known from seamounts and knolls.

References

External links 
 
 Cetoconcha elegans at the World Register of Marine Species (WoRMS)

Poromyidae
Bivalves described in 1991
Bivalves of Europe
Marine molluscs of Europe